The High Commission of Brunei Darussalam in Canada is located in Ottawa, Ontario, Canada, in the Sandy Hill neighbourhood at 395 Laurier Avenue East in the historic building known as Stadacona Hall.

History
Stadacona Hall was built in 1871 by a local lumber baron, John Cameron.  He did not reside in the house long himself, but rented it out to other notables.  The first tenant was the Speaker of the Senate of Canada, Joseph-Édouard Cauchon.  The building was named by Cauchon's wife after Stadacona, the First Nations name for their native Quebec City.

It then became home to Prime Minister John A. Macdonald and his family, who lived there from 1878 to 1883 before moving to Earnscliffe. It later became home to other prominent individuals, including Sir Frederick Borden and William Rowley.

After World War II, it was purchased by the Kingdom of Belgium and became the residence of the Belgian ambassador. In 1995, downsizing led them to put it on the market for $1.7 million.  It was bought by the Government of Brunei Darussalam, which uses the building as its High Commission.

See also
List of designated heritage properties in Ottawa
List of embassies and high commissions in Ottawa

References
"For sale: a slice of history; For $1.7 million, you can buy the 124-year-old mansion where Sir John A. Macdonald once lived." Julia Elliott. The Ottawa Citizen. Ottawa, Ont.: Nov 10, 1995. pg. C.1

External links
Official website

Brunei
Designated heritage properties in Ottawa
Ottawa
Brunei–Canada relations